Harold Allen may refer to:

Harold Allan (1895–1953), Jamaican statesman and first Afro-Jamaican to be knighted by the British Crown
Hank Allen (born 1940), American baseball outfielder
Harold Allen (cricketer, born 1886) (1886–1939), Australian cricketer who played for Tasmania
Harold Allen (cricketer, born 1940) (born 1940), Australian cricketer who played for Tasmania
Harold Allen, founder of Allen Press

See also
Harry Allan (disambiguation)
Harry Allen (disambiguation)
Henry Allan (disambiguation)
Henry Allen (disambiguation)